SS La Bourgogne was a French ocean liner, which sank in a collision July 1898, with the loss of 549 lives. At the time this sinking was infamous, because only 13% of the passengers survived, while 48% of the crew did. In 1886 she set a new record for the fastest Atlantic crossing by a postal steamer.

Construction
She was built in 1885 by Société Nouvelle des Forges et Chantiers de la Méditerranée, La Seyne-sur-Mer for the Compagnie Generale Transatlantique (French Line). There was accommodation for 390 first class passengers, 65 second class and 600 third class passengers.

Career
Launched on 8 October 1885, she sailed on her maiden voyage from Le Havre to New York City on 19 June 1886. In 1886, SS La Bourgogne traveled the Le Havre–New York transit in a little more than seven days. This gave the company first place in the New York postal service and ignited a competition for the record in the trans-Atlantic run. On 29 February 1896 she ran down and sank the anchored British steamer Ailsa, of the Atlas Steamship Company, at the entrance to New York harbour. In 1897–1898 she was fitted with quadruple-expansion engines and her masts reduced to two. She was also involved in a collision with the SS Toreador, which suffered stern damage.

Sinking

The French ship was apparently traveling at full speed despite visibility later estimated at approximately 20 yards.

Captain Oscar Henderson of Cromartyshire was sailing sounding his fog horn and heard a ship's whistle but was unable to determine its direction.  His ship collided with La Bourgogne about midships on the starboard side while most passengers were asleep in their compartments. The liner's compartments adjacent to the collision point filled immediately, starboard side lifeboats were damaged and the ship took a sharp list to starboard, making launching of port side lifeboats difficult. As the ship started to list and the stern went under, an undisciplined rush for lifeboats began. La Bourgogne sank just over half an hour after the collision. The Cromartyshire survived the collision minus the bowspirit,<ref>[https://www.bing.com/images/search?view=detailV2&ccid=VntnrNw1&id=A573B6384E17913217F0BC2CD604630AC039732D&thid=OIP.VntnrNw10VNouA3P7RQo9wHaJR&mediaurl=https%3A%2F%2Fi.imgur.com%2FSaznuoq.jpg&exph=1468&expw=1172&q=Wreck+SS+La+Bourgogne&simid=607989811636537793&ck=303820D1750FF75EB6EA033723580276&selectedindex=3&form=IRPRST&ajaxhist=0&vt=0&sim=11 Damage to Cromartyshire]</ref> but her crew mistook the La Bourgogne whistle and signal rockets for an offer of assistance, and they did not realize what was happening until the whistle fell silent.

Around 5:30 am, the fog thinned out, and the crew of the Cromartyshire spotted and began rescuing survivors from La Bourgogne.

At the time, La Bourgogne'' was carrying a total of 726 people (506 passengers and 220 crew), of whom 549 were lost, including Turkish wrestler Yusuf İsmail, the American instructor/sculptor Emil H. Wuertz, French artist Léon Pourtau, American painter De Scott Evans, an Armenian Orthodox priest, Rev. Stepan Der Stepanian, his wife and three children, wife and daughter of John Forrest Dillon, the wife and child of George Deslions,  and three members of the Boston Symphony Orchestra (which included Pourtau, who in addition to being a painter was a professional clarinetist and principal clarinet of the BSO). Of the 173 survivors, fewer than 70 were passengers, with only one woman rescued out of approximately 300 on board. All children perished. Almost all first class passengers died in the disaster, with survivors largely limited to steerage passengers and sailors. According to survivor accounts, the ship's officers remained at their posts after the collision, with all officers except for the purser failing to survive.

Following the disaster sensational reports circulated that the crew had refused to aid passengers in the water, to the point of stabbing them or hitting them with oars. Surviving crew members required police protection upon their arrival in New York and the French government covered up the tragedy.

Notes

References

External links
SS La Bourgoyne (+1898) Wrecksite

1885 ships
Maritime incidents in 1898
Passenger ships of France
Ships of the Compagnie Générale Transatlantique
Ships sunk in collisions
Maritime incidents in Canada
1898 in Canada
Shipwrecks in the Atlantic Ocean
Ships built in France